This is a list of banks in Sweden, updated from official Swedish financial regulator Finansinspektionen on 2008-03-11.

Central Bank
Sveriges Riksbank

Banking companies (limited liability companies) 
ABG Sundal Collier
Avanza Bank
Bank Norwegian
Bank2 Bankaktiebolag
Bergslagens Sparbank
Carnegie Investment Bank
EFG Investment Bank
Eskilstuna Rekarne Sparbank
Forex Bank
Färs & Frosta Sparbank
GE Money Bank
ICA Banken
Ikanobanken
Klarna Bank AB
Länsförsäkringar Bank
MedMera Bank
Nordea
Nordnet Bank
Northmill Bank
Resurs Bank
Skandiabanken
Skandinaviska Enskilda Banken
Sparbanken Lidköping
Sparbanken Skaraborg
Sparbanken Öresund
Svenska Handelsbanken
Swedbank
Swedbank Sjuhärad
Tjustbygdens Sparbank
Varbergs Sparbank
Vimmerby Sparbank
Volvofinans Konto Bank
Ålandsbanken
Ölands Bank

Members-banks

Ekobanken medlemsbank
JAK members bank

Savings banks
 
Almundsryds Sparbank
Attmars Sparbank
Bjursås Sparbank
Ekeby Sparbank
Falkenbergs Sparbank
Farstorps Sparbank
Frenninge Sparbank
Fryksdalens Sparbank
Glimåkra Sparbank
Göteryds Sparbank
Hudiksvalls Sparbank
Häradssparbanken Mönsterås
Högsby Sparbank
Ivetofta Sparbank i Bromölla
Kinda-Ydre Sparbank
Kristianstads Sparbank
Kyrkhults Sparbank
Laholms Sparbank
Lekebergs Sparbank
Leksands Sparbank
Långasjö Sockens Sparbank
Lönneberga-Tuna-Vena Sparbank
Markaryds sparbank
Mjöbäcks Sparbank
Nordals Härads Sparbank
Norrbärke Sparbank
Närs sparbank
Orusts Sparbank
Roslagens Sparbank
Röke Sockens Sparbank
Sala Sparbank
Sidensjö sparbank
Skatelövs och Västra Torsås Sparbank
Skurups Sparbank
Snapphanebygdens Sparbank
Sparbanken Alingsås
Sparbanken Boken
Sparbanken Gotland
Sparbanken Gute
Sparbanken i Enköping
Sparbanken i Karlshamn
Sparbanken Nord
Sparbanken Syd
Sparbanken Tanum
Sparbanken Tranemo
Sparbanken Västra Mälardalen
Södra Dalarnas Sparbank
Södra Hestra Sparbank
Sölvesborg-Mjällby Sparbank
Sörmlands Sparbank
Tidaholms Sparbank
Tjörns Sparbank
Ulricehamns Sparbank
Vadstena Sparbank
Valdemarsviks Sparbank
Vinslövs Sparbank
Virserums Sparbank
Westra Wermlands Sparbank
Ålems Sparbank
Åryds Sparbank
Åse och Viste härads Sparbank
Åtvidabergs Sparbank
Älmeboda Sparbank

Defunct banks
Östgöta Enskilda Bank (now Danske Bank)

External links
List of banks in Sweden with SWIFT codes and contact information
Contact details of Swedish banks
Details of all private lenders in Sweden

Banks
 
Banks
Sweden
Sweden